The Société des poètes français ("Society of French Poets"), or SPF, was founded in 1902 by José-Maria de Heredia, Sully Prudhomme, and Leon Dierx, on the centenary of the birth of Victor Hugo. The first president was Auguste Dorchain. It is the oldest poetry society in France.

In 1986, it merged with the Sociétés des Amis de Victor Hugo, des Amis de Paul Verlaine, and des Amis de Pierre Corneille. In 1998 it began publishing the work of contemporary poets, and in 2002 opened a bookshop-gallery at L'Espace Mompezat, 16 rue Monsieur-le-Prince, Paris. It was formally recognised as a public utility by a decree of 23 October 2003. The current president is Vital Heurtebise.

It publishes the quarterly magazine Agora, and adjudicates many poetry prizes.

External links
 Official website
 Bulletin trimestriel of the Société des poètes français online in Gallica, the digital library of the BnF.

Poetry organizations
French writers' organizations